Thiago Bomfim Campos Dantas (born September 21, 1990) is a Brazilian field hockey player. He competed for the Brazil men's national field hockey team at the 2016 Summer Olympics.

References

External links
 

1990 births
Living people
Sportspeople from Rio de Janeiro (city)
Brazilian male field hockey players
Olympic field hockey players of Brazil
Field hockey players at the 2015 Pan American Games
Field hockey players at the 2016 Summer Olympics
Pan American Games competitors for Brazil
Male field hockey goalkeepers
21st-century Brazilian people